Accidental (Music for Dance Volume 3) is a studio album by English guitarist, composer and improvisor Fred Frith. It is the third of a series of Music for Dance albums Frith made, and was recorded between December 1995 and January 1996 at Studio Jankowski in Stuttgart, Germany. The album was released on CD in March 2002 on Fred Records and was the first release in Frith's archival release program on the record label.

Background
Accidental was commissioned in 1995 by the British choreographer Paul Selwyn Norton for the dance piece "Rogue Tool", with funding provided by the British Council through the British/Israeli cultural initiative, BI Arts. "Rogue Tool" was premiered by the Batsheva Dance Company in Tel Aviv, Israel in February 1996.

Frith constructed the music on Accidental using a principle he called "block-melodies"  and he incorporated random events, or "accidents", into the compositions, including "found sounds" and field recordings, to trigger new patterns. Frith explained the background to the making of the album:

Reception

Bill Tilland of the BBC wrote in a review of this album:

In a review for AllMusic, François Couture commented: "Accidental may not be as ambitious, challenging, or cutting-edge as the man's other output from the 1990s, but it sure sounds sweet to fans of his avant rock work from the previous two decades. Recommended."

Chris Brook, writing for the Rough Guide to Rock, stated that the album title "suggest[s] exactly the principles behind the compositions," and noted that the recording "took elements as diverse as improvised mandolin and random radio tunings and assembled them into a mesmerizing whole."

Jesse Jarnow of Jambands.com remarked: "When I
listen to Accidental... I don't think in terms of narrative... I imagine something moving. That's not to say that I visualize anything, either. It just moves. It's  a feeling I don't get from... other proper dance/groove music. Groove music makes one move, but there is often little movement within it." He concluded that Accidental "invert[s] that idea, but keep[s] it just as compelling, and a lot more challenging."

Track listing
All tracks composed by Fred Frith.

Personnel
Fred Frith – guitars, violin, keyboards, percussion, samplers, voice

Sound
Extraneous material taken from recordings of demonstrations in New York City and Washington, D.C., and random radio tunings
Engineered by Peter Hardt
Edited and mastered by Peter Hardt and Fred Frith, July 2000
Design and artwork by

Notes

References

External links

2002 albums
Fred Frith albums
Fred Records albums
Albums produced by Fred Frith